This is a list of current heads of houses of colleges, permanent private halls, and recognised independent centres of the University of Oxford.

Colleges

Permanent private halls

Recognised Independent Centres

Other

References

Heads of Houses